Tranderup Parish is a parish in the Diocese of Funen in Ærø Municipality, Denmark.

References 

Parishes in Ærø Municipality
Parishes of Denmark